Mabokelele is a village next to Koloti in the Capricorn District Municipality. It is situated on the R567 road, 25 km northwest of Polokwane, the capital of Limpopo Province in South Africa.

References 

 
 
 

Populated places in the Polokwane Local Municipality